Balance of Power is the eleventh studio album by the Electric Light Orchestra (ELO) released in 1986. It is the final album by the band to feature co-founder Bev Bevan on drums, as well as the last album to feature a significant contribution from keyboardist Richard Tandy.

Overview
Balance of Power was the last studio album by the Electric Light Orchestra before their initial disbanding (the band name would later be resurrected in 2001 and again in 2014 and 2019). By this time Kelly Groucutt had departed and the group was pared down to a trio of Jeff Lynne (who doubled on bass as a result of Groucutt's absence), Richard Tandy and Bev Bevan. Recording for the album began in mid-1984, with a planned release for Spring 1985. The addition of several synthesizer tracks and mixing work by Reinhold Mack to the album caused its release to be pushed back to early 1986. ELO played some live concerts in the UK and Europe (their last for fifteen years), and for one UK show George Harrison performed as guest guitarist.

The video for the single "Calling America" was shot in Paris, and contains shots of the band playing in front of Centre Georges Pompidou. A video was also made for the single "So Serious." The track "Endless Lies" was intended as an homage to Roy Orbison, and was originally recorded for the double LP version of Secret Messages; it reappeared on this album in a slightly reworked and more compact form.

The remastered version of the album was released on 26 February (UK) and 20 March (US) 2007 as part of the Sony/BMG Music Epic/Legacy series.

Europe's CD releases were on CDEPC26467 (Epic) in March 1986. The US (ZK40048) and Japan (32DP407) CD releases were on CBS Associated.

Track listing
All songs written by Jeff Lynne.

Personnel
Jeff Lynne – vocals, electric and acoustic guitars, Synclavier II computer synthesizer, bass guitar, keyboards, percussion, producer
Bev Bevan – drums, percussion, drum programming
Richard Tandy – keyboards, sequence programming

Additional personnel
Christian Schneider – saxophone
Bill Bottrell – engineer
Mack – engineer

Tour line-up
Jeff Lynne – lead vocals, electric guitar
Bev Bevan – drums
Richard Tandy – keyboards
Louis Clark – string synthesizer
Mik Kaminski – violin, synthesizer
Dave Morgan – backing vocals, acoustic guitar, vocoder
Martin Smith - bass guitar

Charts and certifications

Weekly Charts

Certifications

References

Electric Light Orchestra albums
Albums produced by Jeff Lynne
1986 albums
Epic Records albums
Jet Records albums